20 Greatest Hits is a compilation album featuring a selection of songs by The Beatles that were number one singles in the UK and US. It was released on 11 October 1982 in the United States and 18 October in the United Kingdom and marked the 20th anniversary of The Beatles' first record release, "Love Me Do", in the UK in October 1962. 20 Greatest Hits was the last Beatles album to be released with variations between the U.S. and UK versions (some Beatles hits in the US were not released as singles in the UK, such as "Eight Days a Week" and "Yesterday"). There is an extremely rare 8 track tape version of this album, which approximately 10 to 15 copies still exist today. Legend has it that Capitol Records decided to pull the plug on the release at the last minute, as 8 tracks were not selling well in late 1982, and all copies were to be destroyed. However, there were a few that survived.

Releases

UK edition
The UK version of the album comprised all 19 tracks from the 17 Beatles singles to top the UK Singles Chart (including both sides of the double A-sides "Day Tripper"/"We Can Work It Out" and "Yellow Submarine"/"Eleanor Rigby") plus the Beatles' first chart hit "Love Me Do", which peaked at number 17 in the UK.

The songs were presented in their original stereo mixes except for "Love Me Do" and "She Loves You", which used the Duophonic versions – the last time a new Beatles release would use such mixes. Similarly to 1962-1966, 20 Greatest Hits uses the same "whispering intro" mix of "I Feel Fine".

Although many documentaries state that the first number 1 of The Beatles in England was "Please Please Me", the track does not appear in this collection, and also does not appear in the compilation 1.

US edition
For the US LP, catalogue number SV 12245, a five-minute edited version of "Hey Jude" was used due to time constraints.

The American version of this LP was also released in other countries, although the track list does not reflect the local number ones. For instance, in Canada "Can't Buy Me Love" only reached No. 3 on the CHUM singles charts, and the Canadian No. 1 hits "All My Loving" and "This Boy" are omitted.

The New Zealand version was the same as the American one although originally EMI (NZ) was going to issue the UK version. The covers were printed in New Zealand but the inner sleeve was imported from the U.S.

The original issues of this album accidentally indicates the running time of "Yesterday" as being 1:04 in length. Later issues have the correct 2:04 running time.

The album featured the first US appearance of "I Want to Hold Your Hand" and "I Feel Fine" in true stereo.

Other versions
In 1979 and 1980, a similar album called 20 Golden Hits was issued in many countries outside Britain and the U.S.

In Australia, a 23-track alternate version of this album, with bonus EP, was issued titled The Number Ones, released in 1983.

This single-disc compilation was supplanted by the later single-CD album 1 with all 27 of the 28 Beatles songs that were number one on either side of the Atlantic including George Harrison's "Something" that was absent from the original collection. Harrison's "For You Blue", the B-Side of "The Long and Winding Road", which was also charted in the top spot by Billboard, was not included on that album.

Track listing 
All songs written by Lennon–McCartney

UK edition

US edition 

Note: On the US Cassette (EMI-Capitol C4-12245) "Penny Lane" is track 13, but appears at the end of Side 1, rather than the beginning of Side 2.  On the original United States LP and Canadian cassette versions of the album "Hey Jude" was edited 5:09 due to time constraints.  The United States cassette edition contains the full version of the song.

Charts

Charts

Certifications and sales

See also 
 The Number Ones

References 

1982 greatest hits albums
Albums produced by George Martin
Albums produced by Phil Spector
The Beatles compilation albums
Capitol Records compilation albums
Parlophone compilation albums
Albums arranged by George Martin
Albums arranged by Paul McCartney
Albums conducted by George Martin
Albums recorded at Trident Studios
Albums recorded at Apple Studios